The 2016 World Touring Car Championship was the thirteenth season of the FIA World Touring Car Championship, and the twelfth since the series was revived in 2005.

In 2016 a new manufacturer Polestar (with Volvo S60) entered while Citroën reduced the number of official entries to two, and announced their retirement in 2017.
A new team time trial format was introduced for manufacturers, titled Manufacturers Against the Clock (MAC3), consisting in three cars per manufacturer completing two laps at the same time (only one lap at the Nürburgring) against the clock, whereby the total time of the last car determines the result. The cars must finish in a 15 seconds gap.

Teams and drivers
{|
|

Calendar
The provisional 2016 schedule was revealed on 2 December 2015. With the confirmation of the 2016 SMP F4 Championship calendar, it was originally confirmed the season would start at the Sochi Autodrom, with the Russian round of the championship switching from Moscow Raceway. However, on 9 February 2016, the calendar was adjusted, leaving the Russian round at Moscow in June.

Calendar changes
 The Race of Thailand was cancelled after the organiser Eurosport Events and the Thai ASN failed to come to an agreement. No replacement race will be held, reducing the calendar to 11 race weekends.

Results and standings

Compensation weights
The most competitive cars keep an 80 kg compensation weight. The other cars get a lower one, calculated according to their results for the three previous rounds. The less the cars get some good results, the less they get a compensation weight, from 0 kg to 80 kg. For the first two rounds, Citroën C-Elysée WTCC had an 80 kg compensation weight.

Races

Championship standings

Drivers' championship

† – Drivers did not finish the race, but were classified as they completed over 75% of the race distance.

Championship points were awarded on the results of each race at each event as follows:

Notes
1 2 3 4 5 refers to the classification of the drivers after the qualifying for the main race (second race), where bonus points are awarded 5–4–3–2–1.

Manufacturers' Championship

Notes
Only the two best placed cars of each manufacturer earned points.
1 2 3 4 5 refers to the classification of the drivers in the main race qualification, where bonus points are awarded 5–4–3–2–1. Points were only awarded to the fastest two cars from each manufacturer.

In MAC3 points are awarded if 3 cars of the same manufacturer within a 15 seconds gap.
MAC3 points were awarded as follows:

WTCC Trophy
WTCC Trophy points are awarded to the first eight drivers classified in each race on the following scale: 10-8-6-5-4-3-2-1. One point is awarded to the highest-placed WTCC Trophy competitor in qualifying and for another for the fastest lap in each race.

WTCC Teams' Trophy
All the teams taking part in the championship were eligible to score points towards the Teams' Trophy, with the exception of manufacturer teams, with the first two cars from each team scoring points in each race on the following scale: 10-8-6-5-4-3-2-1.

Regulation changes
The sporting regulations were approved by the FIA, at the December 2015 meeting of the World Motor Sport Council.

Sporting regulations
 The reverse grid race of the weekend was switched from race two to race one, with the length of race two being increased by one lap.
 A new qualifying time trial format was introduced for manufacturers, titled Manufacturers Against the Clock (MAC3), to be held at the end of the regular three-part qualifying session.
 Compensation weight for the most successful car was increased to 80 kg.

See also
2016 European Touring Car Cup

Footnotes

References

External links